Fernando Jorge "El Diablo" Castro Trenti (born 14 November 1955) is a Mexican politician affiliated with the Institutional Revolutionary Party (PRI) who served in the LX and the LXI Legislatures as senator representing the State of Baja California.

Castro Trenti holds a bachelor's degree in law from the National Autonomous University of Mexico (UNAM). He had occupied different positions in the public service sector in Baja California. From 2001 to 2004 he served as a local deputy in the Congress of Baja California. In 2004 Jorge Hank Rhon designated him as secretary of government of the Municipality of Tijuana but left that position to run as senator. He secured a seat in the senate during the 2006 congressional elections as the first minority senator; hence he would have served during the LX and the LXI Legislatures (2006–2012).

As a Senate for the LX Legislature, he presided both Communications and Transports and Internal Administration for the Senate, he is well known as one of the most recognized political operators for his party and country, and well known as responsible for the retrieval of power in the 2010 Municipal and local congress elections for [the] PRI (Revolutionary Institutional Party), and as a consequence for the still official Party, situation that has set him as a potential candidate for the governor's office of Baja California. He ran in the 2013 election and lost to the PAN candidate Francisco Vega de Lamadrid.

References

Living people
1955 births
Place of birth missing (living people)
Institutional Revolutionary Party politicians
Members of the Senate of the Republic (Mexico)
Mexican people of Italian descent
21st-century Mexican politicians
Members of the Congress of Baja California
National Autonomous University of Mexico alumni